Kang may refer to:

Places
 Kang Kalan, Punjab
 Kang District, Afghanistan
 Kang, Botswana, a village
 Kang County, Gansu, China
 Kang, Isfahan, Iran, a village
 Kang, Kerman, Iran, a village
 Kang, Razavi Khorasan, Iran, a village
 Kham (康), also transliterated as Kang, an area of eastern Tibet and western Sichuan
 Kangju, an ancient kingdom in Central Asia
 Xikang, a province of the Republic of China from 1939 to 1955

People

Royalty
 Tai Kang (reigned 2117–2088 BC), third sovereign of the Xia Dynasty
 King Kang of Zhou (reigned 1020-996 BC or 1005-978 BC), third sovereign of the Chinese Zhou Dynasty
 King Kang of Chu (died 545 BC), in ancient China
 Duke Kang of Qi (died 379 BC), titular ruler of Qi
 Emperor Kang of Jin (322-344), of the Eastern Jin Dynasty

Surname
 Kang (Chinese surname), a Chinese surname (康)
 Kang (Korean surname), a common Korean surname (강; 姜)
 C.S. Eliot Kang (born 1962), American diplomat and member of the U.S. Senior Executive Service
 Eugene Kang (born 1984), Special Projects Coordinator and Confidential Assistant to U.S. President Barack Obama
 Jimmy Kang, American music producer and executive
 Kristi Kang (born 1984), American voice actress affiliated with Funimation
 Kang Kek Iew (1942–2020), leader of the Cambodian Khmer Rouge, convicted of crimes against humanity
 David Kang, an Australian barrister and gunman

Characters
 Kang and Kodos, green one-eyed aliens in The Simpsons
 Kang the Conqueror, a Marvel Comics supervillain
 Kang (Star Trek), a Klingon warrior in Star Trek television series
 Liu Kang, a character in the Mortal Kombat series
 Meng Kang, a character in the Water Margin
 Kang the Mad, a character in Jade Empire 2005 video game
 Kang Tongbi or Widow Kang, a character in The Years of Rice and Salt 2002 counterfactual novel
 Suzie Kang, an object-tracker in The Lost Room mini-series
 The Kangs, two warring gangs in the "Paradise Towers" 1987 Doctor Who episode

Other uses
 Kang, the star Kappa Virginis
 Kang bed-stove
 K'ang jo fu or the kang, a self-defense technique
 KANG-LD, a TV station, San Angelo, Texas, US
 KEUS-LD, a TV station, San Angelo, Texas, US, formerly KANG-CA
 KANG-TV, a TV station in Waco, Texas, sold to KWTX-TV